Autrans is a former commune in the Isère department in the Rhône-Alpes region of south-eastern France. On 1 January 2016, it was merged into the new commune of Autrans-Méaudre-en-Vercors.

At the 1968 Winter Olympics in Grenoble, it hosted the biathlon, cross-country skiing, Nordic combined, and the ski jumping normal hill events.

The inhabitants of the commune are known as Autranais or Autranaises.

The commune has been awarded one flower by the National Council of Towns and Villages in Bloom in the Competition of cities and villages in Bloom.

Geography
Autrans is located on the Vercors Plateau in the Vercors Regional Natural Park some 10 km west of Grenoble and 11 km east of Vinay. Access to the commune is solely by the D106C which branches north from the D106 and passes in a loop through the village then back south to Méaudre. A local road goes north from the village along to the valley to the ski fields in the north of the commune. There is farmland in the valley but the slopes of the surrounding mountains are rugged and heavily forested.

The Meaudret rises in the north of the commune and flows south down the valley through the village and continues south to join the Bourne at Les Jarrands.

Bus line 5120 connects Lans-en-Vercors and Villard-de-Lans stops in Autrans village and Méaudre (the square). There is a shuttle bus in winter from the village to the ski fields.

Hiking trails
There are two main hiking trails crossing the commune: municipality is crossed by
the GR 9;
the GR footpath: Tour of the Four Mountains.

Places and hamlets

 L'Achard
 Les Ronins
 Les Prud'hommes
 Villeneuve
 Eybertière
 Le Bourg du-dessus
 Les Eperouses
 Le Bourg du dessous
 Le Bouchet
 Le Truc
 Andrevière
 Les Gonnets
 Les Tranchants
 Les Vernes
 Les Gaillards
 Le Mollaret
 Le Tonkin
 Les Franques
 Payenat
 Écharlière

Neighbouring communes and villages

Toponymy
The name Autrans is derived from the name of a village called Lans (the oldest village on the plateau) and originated from oultre-Lans meaning "beyond the village of Lans" which, over the course of time, was transformed into Autrans.

History

The 1968 Olympics in Grenoble (which were the first to be aired on TV) included cross-country skiing, biathlon, ski-jumping (90m ski-jump) and combined Nordic skiing (jumping and cross-country). For many French people the TV images of Nordic skiing at Autrans were a revelation. This would mark the beginning of the development of skiing in France and throughout Europe;
The Grenoble Olympic Winter Games 1968 ski-jumps were part of a long local tradition of ski jumping (first ski competition in 1911). Today jumps of 90 m, 56 m, and 20 m are equipped to be used in winter and in summer for many national and international competitions. There is a viewing platform at the top of the 90 m ramp.

Heraldry

Administration

List of Successive Mayors

Public services

The commune has the following services:
 A Tourist office;
 A Fire Station;
 An Isere General Council road maintenance depot

Twinning

Autrans has twinning associations with:
 Lillehammer (Norway) since 1994.

Demography
In 2012 the commune had 1,628 inhabitants.

Economy

Winter Sports

Alpine ski area: a large field of Sure, a small field of Claret, night skiing, beginner park.
Nordic ski area, cross country skiing, snowshoeing - the French capital of Nordic skiing.
The economy is mainly based on tourism.

Tourism in the early 21st century focused primarily on the healthy climate and the station hosted many children who had health problems - especially respiratory.

Agriculture
In the early 1900s there were nearly 130 farms. Today there are 17 farms including 13 dairy farms in Autrans. Milk production is transformed into the Bleu du Vercors-Sassenage AOC in Col Vert, Brique, Saint Marcellin. Autrans also has cattle farms for meat and farm produce and a pigeon farm to serve the best restaurants. Every year on the 1st weekend in May the operation "Take the key to the fields" can visit the farms on the Vercors Plateau and discover their products.

There are also Forestry activities.

Culture and Heritage

Architectural Heritage
A Romanesque church is located on a hill in the centre of the village. Only the bell tower is from the Middle Ages (12th to 13th centuries), its stone spire dates back to the 17th and 18th centuries, the choir and the nave of the building are from 1875.

Archaeological Heritage
Autrans has three sites: a Motte-and-bailey castle and two fortified houses at Malatan and La Tour hamlets. Of these three sites nothing remains except mounds and that can be seen today in the landscape.

The Motte du Chateau is located approximately 1 km to the east of Autrans Church on a Moraine. A wattle and daub building existed on the mound in the 11th century.
Malatan is located approximately 300 m south-east of the Motte du Chateau and is an old fortified house probably dating from the 14th century.
The Tower is located approximately 200 m to the north of the hamlet of Andrevières and excavations have identified the remains of a round tower probably dating from the 12th century.

Underground heritage
The Ture Cave is located near the hamlet of Naves. It is used today for an introduction to caving or the simple discovery of an underground world because it has fairly easy access.

Local life

Sports
The Gève Domain is located 1,300 m above sea level and has an international reputation. Located to the north of the Massif du Vercors, the snow conditions are exceptional. This area is accessible by car and there are free shuttles to all valid ski pass holders for the Autrans ski resort.

Sporting events
The Foulée blanche (White Stride) event has been held every year since 1979 in January. It is a cross-country skiing race attracting nearly 5,000 participants.

Cultural Events

The Autrans Internet Meeting is an annual event dedicated to the understanding of the future of the Internet. The event started in 1997 and is held every year in January.

Education
The town has a public kindergarten and a public primary school.

Notable people linked to the commune 
Léonce-Émile Durand-Savoyat, former mayor of Autrans, MP and Senator for Isère.
Many natives of Autrans have been members of different French national ski teams and have won many national titles.

See also
Communes of the Isère department
Parc naturel régional du Vercors

References

External links

Autrans official website 
Festitrail of Autrans 
Autran on the 1750 Cassini Map

Venues of the 1968 Winter Olympics
Former communes of Isère
Olympic biathlon venues
Olympic cross-country skiing venues
Olympic Nordic combined venues
Olympic ski jumping venues
Sports venues in Isère
Dauphiné